The Afe Annang was formed at the end of the civil war in Nigeria with the goal of fighting the marginalization of the Annang by the Nigerian government. This single umbrella organization was to be the single voice of the Annang since most of the Annang leaders were killed during the war. The lack of a representative at the Nigerian policy table made the organization necessary. The need to make the organization authentic and to have it in line with traditional systems resulted in the creation of the office of a supreme head known as Itai Annang, literally translated, it is the head pillar of Annang. The office, however is not a traditional one and did not exist until the formation of the organization. It represents a political attempt at cohesiveness among the various Annang groups and allows the office holder to serve as a symbol of unity.
    
The traditional Obong Council of the Annang people is called Afe Annang and the council or legislature, or assembly is called Afe. Selection of an Obong is typically based upon a consensus of the village or clan through this complex social system.   
   
The leader of the traditional governing council of Annang people is called "Itai Afe Annang". The Itai Afe Annang is regarded as  the traditional leader and has no authority as the monarch of the Annang people.
The first Itai Afe Annang was Late Obong, Sir, Dr Ephraim U. Essien I.

See also
 Annang
 Ikot Ekpene

External links
 Annang Heritage Preservation Inc.

History of Nigeria
Efik